Psidium havanense is a species of plant in the family Myrtaceae. It is endemic to Cuba.  It is threatened by habitat loss.

References

Endemic flora of Cuba
havanense
Endangered plants
Taxonomy articles created by Polbot
Plants described in 1928